1 Samuel 20 is the twentieth chapter of the First Book of Samuel in the Old Testament of the Christian Bible or the first part of the Books of Samuel in the Hebrew Bible. According to Jewish tradition the book was attributed to the prophet Samuel, with additions by the prophets Gad and Nathan, but modern scholars view it as a composition of a number of independent texts of various ages from c. 630–540 BCE. This chapter contains the account of David's escape from Saul's repeated attempts to kill him. This is within a section comprising 1 Samuel 16 to 2 Samuel 5 which records the rise of David as the king of Israel.

Text
This chapter was originally written in the Hebrew language. It is divided into 42 verses.

Textual witnesses
Some early manuscripts containing the text of this chapter in Hebrew are of the Masoretic Text tradition, which includes the Codex Cairensis (895), Aleppo Codex (10th century), and Codex Leningradensis (1008). Fragments containing parts of this chapter in Hebrew were found among the Dead Sea Scrolls including 4Q51 (4QSam; 100–50 BCE) with extant verses 37–40 and 4Q52 (4QSam; 250 BCE) with extant verses 26–42.

Extant ancient manuscripts of a translation into Koine Greek known as the Septuagint (originally was made in the last few centuries BCE) include Codex Vaticanus (B; B; 4th century) and Codex Alexandrinus (A; A; 5th century).

Places 

Bethlehem
Naioth in Ramah

Analysis
A continuing major theme in this chapter is how Saul's family acted against Saul and sided with David, especially Jonathan, who had previously managed to reconcile both of them, now was forced to take sides. Initially he stood by his father and his father's oath not to harm David (19:6) that he refused to believe that David was close to death, nonetheless he was willing to find out Saul's true intention during the Feast of the New Moon and to inform David using their agreed coded message about the outcome. At this time Saul explicitly told Jonathan that their dynasty of kingship could not be realized as long as David was alive. However, Saul's blind ambition had enlarged the extent of the rift between him and his family, to the point that his enmity towards David had 'isolated him from his own kin'.

Jonathan and David renew their covenant (20:1–29)
After escaping from Saul's pursuit in Naioth, David once again sought Jonathan to find out why Saul wanted to kill him. They agreed on a method whereby Jonathan, after establishing Saul's intention, would, unknown to anyone else, inform David.

Verse 5
And David said to Jonathan, “Indeed tomorrow is the New Moon, and I should not fail to sit with the king to eat. But let me go, that I may hide in the field until the third day at evening."
"New Moon": a festival that consists of sacrificial offerings (Numbers 28:11–15) and celebratory feasts, which was also observed in other parts of ancient world, including Mesopotamia and Babylon. The feast may require the entire clan to be present and this was used as an excuse for David to be absent before the king. The eldest son was likely to gather all members,  so David requested to be let go to "see my brothers" (1 Samuel 20:29). According to this chapter, the feast lasted for three days.

Verse 19And when you have stayed three days, go down quickly and come to the place where you hid on the day of the deed; and remain by the stone Ezel."Have stayed three days": from Hebrew: , shillashta, “to do a third time”, which could be emended into , shillishit, “[on the] third [day]”.

Saul seeks to kill Jonathan (20:30–42)
Jonathan opened the conversation with Saul by providing an excuse for David's absence, then with a defense of David (verse 32) echoing David's own words in verse 1, which moved from being a position of conciliator between David and Saul to be of David's defender under threat from his father (verses 30–33). Saul's fierce reply and attempt to kill Jonathan shows that David had little choice but to leave Saul's court and run away, not out of disloyalty nor for his own ambition, but due to events beyond his control. A promise is made by David to extend his covenant with Jonathan to include Jonatan's 'house' (verse 15) and his 'descendants' (verse 42), anticipating David's kindness to Jonathan's son, Mephibosheth (2 Samuel 9) and the survival of the house of Saul.

Verse 42And as soon as the lad was gone, David arose out of a place toward the south, and fell on his face to the ground, and bowed himself three times: and they kissed one another, and wept one with another, until David exceeded."Out of a place toward the south": translated from Masoretic Hebrew text , mê- ha-. Septuagint in Codex Vaticanus renders it "from the Argab" (argab = "a heap of stones") or "from beside the mound", whereas Septuagint in Codex Alexandrinus has “from sleep.”  The Chaldee version reads, “from the stone of the sign (or the stone Atha'') which is on the south”. The different versions (Arabic, Syriac) have here the repetition of the statement in 1 Samuel 20:19.

See also

Related Bible parts: 1 Samuel 15, 1 Samuel 18, 1 Samuel 19

Notes

References

Sources

Commentaries on Samuel

General

External links
 Jewish translations:
 Shmuel I - I Samuel - Chapter 20 (Judaica Press). Hebrew text and English translation [with Rashi's commentary] at Chabad.org
 Christian translations:
 Online Bible at GospelHall.org (ESV, KJV, Darby, American Standard Version, Bible in Basic English)
 1 Samuel chapter 20. Bible Gateway

20